The Russian Chapel in Darmstadt, formally, the St. Mary Magdalene Chapel, is a historic Russian Orthodox church at Mathildenhöhe in Darmstadt, Germany.

The Russian revival style church with gold Onion domes was built between 1897–1899 by the architect Leon Benois, and used as a private chapel by the last Emperor of Russia, Nicholas II, whose wife Alexandra was born in Darmstadt. It is named in honor of the patron saint of Nicholas II's mother. It was built of Russian stone and, as some people claim, built on soil from Russia brought to Darmstadt by train, and used during their lifetimes by the Russian Imperial family and court during regular visits to the Empress's childhood home and to her family.

References

External links
 

19th-century Russian Orthodox church buildings
Russian Orthodox church buildings in Germany
Churches in Darmstadt
Chapels in Germany
Russian Orthodox chapels
Church buildings with domes